is a railway station in Kōtō, Tokyo, Japan. Its station number is S-16 and is served by the Toei Shinjuku Line. The station opened on December 21, 1978. It is a station in the form of a bridge over the Kyu-Naka river.

Platforms
Higashi-ojima Station consists of two side platforms served by two tracks. It has two exits on the two ends of the platform. These are the Komatsugawa exit and the Ojima exit.

Surrounding area
The station is located on top of the Kyu-Naka River as a bridge, northeast of the intersection of Tokyo Metropolitan Routes 50 (Shin-Ōhashi-dōri) and 477 (Banshobashi-dōri), with the station platforms stretching across the Kyū-Naka River. The station lies in the midst of several parks and recreational facilities, with the Komatsugawa danchi owned by Urban Renaissance to the southeast. Other points of interest include:
 Arakawa River
 Ōjima-Komatsugawa Park
 Higashi-Ōjima Library
 Jōtō Social Insurance Hospital

Connecting bus service
Toei Bus
Higashi-Ōjima-Ekimae (Ōjima-guchi)
 Mon 21: for Monzen-Nakachō Station via Kame-Takahashi and Tōyōchō Station
 Kusa 24: for Asakusa-Kotobukichō
 Kin 28: for Kinshichō-Ekimae
 Yō 20: for Tōyōchō Station via Kōtō Geriatric Medical Center
 (none): for Kasaibashi
Higashi-Ōjima-Eki-Iriguchi
 Kame 24: for Kasaibashi, Kameido Station, Higashi-Ōjima-Ekimae
 FL01: for Kinshichō-Ekimae, Kasai-Ekimae
Higashi-Ōjima-Ekimae (Komatsugawa-guchi)
 Hira 28: for Hirai-Sōshajo
 AL01: for Cherry Garden (loop)

Line
 Tokyo Metropolitan Bureau of Transportation - Toei Shinjuku Line

References

External links

 Tokyo Metropolitan Bureau of Transportation: Higashi-ojima Station

Railway stations in Japan opened in 1978
Railway stations in Tokyo